Allen Taylor Caperton (November 21, 1810 – July 26, 1876) was an American politician who was a United States senator from the State of West Virginia in 1875–1876. He was a member of the Democratic Party. He had been in the Virginia House of Delegates and Virginia State Senate before the American Civil War. During the Civil War, he was a Confederate States senator.

Early life
Caperton, son of Hugh Caperton and Jane Erskine, was born near Union, Monroe County, West Virginia (now West Virginia) on November 21, 1810. At the age of 14, he traveled by horseback to Huntsville, Alabama, to attend school. He later graduated from the University of Virginia at Charlottesville, then graduated from Yale College in 1832. He studied law in Staunton, Virginia, was admitted to the bar and practiced law. He was married to Harriett Echols.

Political career
Caperton was a member of the Virginia House of Delegates in 1841–1842. He was elected a member of the Virginia Senate in 1844 and sat until 1848. He was a member of the Virginia House of Delegates again from 1857 to 1861. In 1850, he was a delegate to the State constitutional convention. In 1861, he was a member of the Virginia Secession Convention.

During the Civil War, he was elected by the legislature of Virginia to be a member of the Confederate States Senate in which he sat until 1865.

After the war, he was the first ex-Confederate elected to the United States Senate, entering office as a Democrat from West Virginia, from March 4, 1875, until his death in Washington, D.C., on July 26, 1876. He was interred in Green Hill Cemetery in Union, West Virginia.

His residence near Union,, "Elmwood," was listed on the National Register of Historic Places in 1976.

See also
List of United States Congress members who died in office (1790–1899)

References

 Retrieved on March 23, 2009

External links
 
 

|-

1810 births
1876 deaths
Confederate States of America senators
19th-century American politicians
Democratic Party United States senators from West Virginia
People from Union, West Virginia
People of Virginia in the American Civil War
People of West Virginia in the American Civil War
Virginia lawyers
West Virginia Democrats
Virginia Secession Delegates of 1861
Caperton family of Virginia and West Virginia
Yale College alumni
University of Virginia alumni
West Virginia lawyers